Uncia Airport  is a high-elevation airport serving the cities of Llallagua and Uncia in the Potosí Department of Bolivia.

The airport is just east of Uncia. There is mountainous terrain in all quadrants.

See also

Transport in Bolivia
List of airports in Bolivia

References

External links
OpenStreetMap - Uncia

Airports in Potosí Department